Olga Modrachová, married Davidová (9 May 1930 – 30 January 1995) was a Czech athlete. She competed in the women's high jump at the 1952 Summer Olympics and the 1956 Summer Olympics.

Her husband was Jiří David, a Czech sprinter.

References

1930 births
1995 deaths
Athletes (track and field) at the 1952 Summer Olympics
Athletes (track and field) at the 1956 Summer Olympics
Czech female high jumpers
Czech female long jumpers
Czech female hurdlers
Czech female sprinters
Czech heptathletes
Olympic athletes of Czechoslovakia
Athletes from Prague